Foxwood may refer to:

Foxwood, Virginia
Foxwood School